Teto, or Teto the Clown, is among the most popular of the children’s toy clown puppets created by Hazelle Hedges Rollins for her company in Kansas City, Missouri.

In other media
 Teto was seen in Puppet Master and Puppet Master: Axis of Evil as a puppet decoration along with the other puppets.
 Teto also made his cameo appearance in the TV series of Gumby, Season 1 of Ep. 18, entitled "Toying Around" as a puppet decoration along with the other puppets.

References

Clowns
Puppets